Swarthmore Lecture is one of a series of lectures, started in 1908, addressed to Britain Yearly Meeting of the Religious Society of Friends (Quakers).

The preface to the very first lecture explains the purpose of the series.

“This book is the first of a series of public addresses to be known as the Swarthmore Lectures. The Lectureship was established by the Woodbrooke Extension Committee, at a meeting held December 9th, 1907. The Minute of the Committee provides for “an annual lecture on some subject relating to the Message and Work of the Society of Friends.” The name “Swarthmore” was chosen in memory of the home of Margaret Fox, which was always open to the earnest seeker after Truth, and from which loving words of sympathy and substantial material help were sent to fellow-workers.

“The Woodbrooke Extension Committee requested Rufus M. Jones, M.A., D.Litt., of Haverford College, Pennsylvania, to give the first lecture on the evening preceding the holding of the Friends’ Yearly Meeting of 1908. In accordance with this decision, the lecture was delivered in the Central Hall, Birmingham, on May 19th.

“The Swarthmore Lectureship has been founded with a two-fold purpose: firstly, to interpret further to the members of the Society of Friends their Message and Mission; and secondly, to bring before the public the spirit, the aims and the fundamental principles of the Friends. This first lecture presents Quakerism as a religion of experience and first-hand reality—a dynamic, practical religion of life.”

Transcripts and recording of some of the lectures are available from the Woodbrooke Quaker Study Centre website.

List of Swarthmore Lectures 

For further details see the list of lectures at the Woodbrooke Centre.

References

External links

 Woodbrooke Quaker Study Centre
 Recordings of some of the lectures
 Nayler.org has reviews of some of the lectures

British lecture series
Christian theological lectures
Quakerism in the United Kingdom
Religious education in the United Kingdom
1908 establishments in the United Kingdom